Ronald Lee Hopkins (born November 10, 1960) is a former American football defensive back who played nine seasons with the Calgary Stampeders of the Canadian Football League. He played college football at Murray State University.

College career
Hopkins played for the Murray State Racers from 1979 to 1982. He earned All-OVC honors his senior season in 1982. He was inducted into the Murray State Athletics Hall of Fame in 2014.

Professional career
Hopkins played in 132 games for the Calgary Stampeders from 1983 to 1991.

References

External links
Just Sports Stats

Living people
1960 births
American football defensive backs
American football return specialists
Canadian football defensive backs
Canadian football return specialists
African-American players of American football
African-American players of Canadian football
Murray State Racers football players
Calgary Stampeders players
21st-century African-American people
20th-century African-American sportspeople